Derek Arthur Ramsay Jr. (born December 7, 1976) is a British-Filipino model, actor, and host. As of 2019, he is an exclusive talent of GMA Network. In 2021, he file for indefinite leave and is currently inactive in showbiz to attend personal life.

Early life and education
Ramsay was born on December 7, 1976, in Enfield, England, and he was raised in Cainta, Rizal, Philippines. His Filipina mother, Remedios Paggao, was the head of the housekeeping unit of 11 Cadogan Gardens in England, and his British father, Derek Arthur Ramsay Sr. was an inspector for the Metropolitan Police Service stationed in Scotland Yard. He was educated in the Philippines at Maria Montessori High School and a boarding school in England. He studied for an undergraduate degree in marketing in New Hampshire and Boston.

Career

Modelling
Early in the 2000s, Ramsay found work as an MTV VJ, a model, as well as TV commercial actor.

Television and film
Ramsay first came into wider public attention in Eat Bulaga! as a co-host of the segment Pool Watch from 2001 to 2004 on GMA Network.

In April 2012, he signed a three-year contract and transferred to TV5.

His first show on TV5 was The Amazing Race Philippines. After his contract expired in February 2015, he signed another three-year contract with TV5 on 28 April 2015.

After months of speculations about network transfer, Ramsay returned to GMA Network and signed an exclusive contract with the network on 3 April 2019. He started in the network as a co-host of Eat Bulaga! from 2001 to 2004. His first comeback Kapuso project was The Better Woman that garnered high ratings aired on 2019.

In 2020, he was supposed to topbilled a project Kapuso project entitled Sanggang Dikit however because of the pandemic the production was halt. Later on, he received an offer to do with To Love and To Hold but he declines the role due to lock-in taping.

Showbiz hiatus
On December, 2021, Ramsey and GMA Network have agreed that the actor will take an "indefinite leave" and "freeze the contract" from showbiz to attend to "personal matters and family".

Sports

Basketball
Ramsay also played basketball competitively. In 2004, he played for the Toyota Otis–Letran Knights in the now-defunct Philippine Basketball League. He would make his return to the sport, after joining the Batangas City Athletics of the Maharlika Pilipinas Basketball League (MPBL) for the 2019–20 MPBL Lakan Season. He debuted for the team in Batangas' 80–67 win against the Caloocan Supremos in July 2019.

Beach soccer
Ramsay is currently the head ambassador of the Philippine national beach soccer team, and was set to participate in the 2013 FIFA Beach Soccer World Cup Asian qualifiers, but ultimately did not due to his commitment to Kidlat, where he was playing the lead role.

Golf
He also plays golf, a sport which he took up after his involvement in the 2014 film Trophy Wife. Along with John Estrada, Ramsay won the 2017 Jack Nicklaus International Invitational, a recreational golf tournament in Dublin, Ohio.

Ultimate
Ramsay has also been a competitor for the Philippines national ultimate frisbee team. He was the ninth top scorer at the 13th World Ultimate and Guts Championship 2012.

He represented the Philippines again as part of the Boracay Dragons in the 2017 World Championships of Beach Ultimate.

Personal life 
Ramsay married fellow actor Ellen Adarna on November 11, 2021.

Filmography

Television

Film

Awards and nominations

Notes

References

External links

GMA Network profile

1979 births
Living people
21st-century Filipino male actors
Filipino sportspeople
Filipino male models
Filipino people of British descent
English people of Filipino descent
Filipino television personalities
Filipino male film actors
Filipino male television actors
Male actors from Manila
Filipino television presenters
Filipino television variety show hosts
GMA Network personalities
ABS-CBN personalities
TV5 (Philippine TV network) personalities
Star Magic
Viva Artists Agency
British VJs (media personalities)
People from Enfield, London
People from Muntinlupa
Filipino men's basketball players
Basketball players from Greater London
Maharlika Pilipinas Basketball League players